Jeffrey Schiff is an artist working in Brooklyn, New York. He currently teaches at Wesleyan University.

Selected exhibitions
2003, Wesleyan University, Olin Memorial Library, The Library Project
2000, Bose Pacia Modern, NY, Boundlessly Various and Everything Simultaneously
1995, South Station, Boston, Destination
1983, Institute of Contemporary Art, Boston, Unitled

References

External links
 http://jschiff.web.wesleyan.edu

American artists
Living people
Wesleyan University faculty
Year of birth missing (living people)